Verkh-Yusva is a rural locality (a selo) in Leninskoye Rural Settlement, Kudymkarsky District, Perm Krai, Russia. The population was 733 as of 2010. There are 24 streets.

Geography 
Verkh-Yusva is located 25 km south of Kudymkar (the district's administrative centre) by road. Panya is the nearest rural locality.

References 

Rural localities in Kudymkarsky District